Yvoir is a municipality of Wallonia located in the province of Namur, Belgium. 

On 1 January 2006 the municipality had 8,450 inhabitants. The total area is 56.84 km2, making it a population density of 149 inhabitants per km2.

The municipality consists of the following districts: Dorinne, Durnal, Evrehailles, Godinne, Houx, Mont, Purnode, Spontin and Yvoir.

Sport
Yvoir was the host city of the 1975 UCI Road World Championships

Healthcare 
Yvoir hosts the Mont-Godinne site of the CHU UCLouvain Namur university hospital, serving as teaching hospital for the University of Louvain.

See also
 List of protected heritage sites in Yvoir

References

External links
 
Official website (in French)

 
Municipalities of Namur (province)